Special Forces units in Indonesia are composed from the Indonesian Armed Forces and Indonesian National Police which consist of the following units:

 Joint units
 Kopassus,  special forces and counter-terrorism military unit of Indonesia.
 Indonesian Army
 Kopassus, special forces and Army counter-terrorist unit.
 Tontaipur (Peleton Intai Tempur - Combat Reconnaissance Platoon), platoon-sized special reconnaissance unit under Army Strategic Reserve Command.
 Indonesian Navy
INSFOC, is the joint special forces team of specially trained members from the other Indonesian Navy special forces corps such as Kopaska, taifib, and denjaka.
 Kopaska, commando frogman unit.
 Taifib, reconnaissance-commando unit, under command of the Marine Corps
 Denjaka, special operations and maritime counter-terrorism forces.
 Kesatuan Gurita, Indonesian Marine Corps counter Terrorism unit.
 Indonesian Air Force
 Kopasgat, special operations unit, particularly used in the role of airfield security, seizure, control, air defense, combat control, and combat search and rescue, also counter-terrorism. 
Bravo Detachment 90 is a counter-terrorism unit whose personnel are specialists recruited and chosen from the Indonesian Air Force's Paskhas corps.
Indonesian National Police
Brimob, is the special police force of Indonesia and is also known as a Paramilitary-law enforcement force of Indonesia
Detachment 88, is the special counter-terrorism police unit of Indonesia